Saints: The Story of the Church of Jesus Christ in the Latter Days is a planned four-volume history of the Church of Jesus Christ of Latter-day Saints (LDS Church), published beginning in 2018. 

The first volume of Saints was initially published in fourteen languages and made available as a free digital book. It was written by a team of six writers, edited by another team, and reviewed by several historians for accuracy.

Saints is the first official history published by the LDS Church since general authority B. H. Roberts put together his six-volume chronicle, Comprehensive History of The Church of Jesus Christ of Latter-day Saints. Steven E. Snow is credited with the production and introduction of this new, narrative history of the LDS Church. The first volume was published in September 2018 and sold a reported 340,000 copies; the second volume followed in February 2020. The first volume tackles sensitive topics, "A nearly 600-page book that covers early church history from 1815–1846 doesn't dwell on polygamy, but doesn't entirely skip over it either."

Summary of volumes 
Saints: The Story of the Church of Jesus Christ in the Latter Days: Volume 1: The Standard of Truth: 1815–1846 (LDS Church, September 4, 2018.)
Beginning with the childhood of Joseph Smith and ending with the Mormon exodus from Nauvoo, Illinois.
Saints: The Story of the Church of Jesus Christ in the Latter Days: Volume 2: No Unhallowed Hand: 1846–1893 (LDS Church, February 12, 2020.)
Beginning with the Mormon exodus from Nauvoo, Illinois, and tracing the history of the church through to the dedication of the Salt Lake Temple in 1893.
Saints, Volume 3: Boldly, Nobly, and Independent, 1893–1955 (LDS Church, April 22, 2022.)
Beginning with the Tabernacle Choir's performance at the 1893 World's Columbian Exposition and ending with the dedication of the Bern Switzerland Temple, in 1955.

One more volume is planned for release:

 Volume 4 will cover the church's history from 1955 to the present day.

References

External links
Saints: The Story of the Church of Jesus Christ in the Latter Days Official site

2018 non-fiction books
2020 non-fiction books
History books about the Latter Day Saint movement
Books about Joseph Smith
The Church of Jesus Christ of Latter-day Saints texts
2018 in Christianity
History of the Church of Jesus Christ of Latter-day Saints